Balthasar of Mecklenburg (1451 – 16 March 1507) was a Duke of Mecklenburg and Coadjutor of the Diocese of Hildesheim between 1471 and 1474 and the Diocese of Schwerin between 1474 and 1479.

Balthasar was the youngest son of Henry IV, Duke of Mecklenburg and Dorothea of Brandenburg, the daughter of the Margrave Frederick I of Brandenburg.  When he came of age, Balthasar chose an ecclesiastical career.  He was coadjutor of the Diocese of Hildesheim in the years 1471-1474 and then in the Diocese of Schwerin from 1474 to 1479.  He probably was not satisfied with ecclesiastical life and returned to lay status in 1479.  After mediation by his mother, an agreement was reached on 13 January 1480 between him and his older brothers to divide the duchy.  His brother Albert VI received the larger part of the former Principality of Werle, while Balthasar and his brother Magnus II jointly administered the rest of the Duchy.  After Magnus died, Balthasar ruled jointly with Magnus' sons.

Balthasar died on 16 March 1507 (or, less likely, on 17 March) in Wismar and was buried in the Doberan Abbey in Bad Doberan.

He married Margaret, daughter of Duke Eric II of Pomerania, in 1487.  They had no children.

External links 
 genealogical table of the House of Mecklenburg

1451 births
1507 deaths
15th-century German people
16th-century German people
Lutheran Prince-Bishops of Schwerin
Dukes of Mecklenburg-Schwerin
German Roman Catholics
House of Mecklenburg
People from Mecklenburg